The 2014–15 Liga III season is the 59th season of the Liga III, the third tier of the Romanian football league system. The season began on 30 August.

There is a new system, with five series of 13/14 teams that will play a regular season as a round-robin tournament. At the end of the regular season, the first team from each series will promote to Liga II. The last two teams from the series with 14 teams and the last one from the series with 13 teams will relegate to Liga IV. From the 12th placed teams, another three are relegated. To determine these teams, separate standings are computed, using only the games played against clubs ranked 1st through 11th.

Teams

At the end of 2013–14 season, FCM Dorohoi from Seria I, FC Voluntari from Seria II, CS Balotești from Seria III, FC Caransebeș from Seria IV, Șoimii Pâncota from Seria V and Fortuna Poiana Câmpina from Seria VI promoted to Liga II. Sixteen teams were relegated to Liga IV : CSM Moinești, Sporting Suceava, FCM Bacău (Seria I), Conpet Cireșu, Progresul Cernica and Rapid Fetești (Seria II), FC Balș (Seria III), Munictorul, FCM Reșița, Jiul Rovinari, Minerul Mătăsari, FC Avrig (Seria IV), FC Maramureș (Seria V), CSM Câmpina, Conpet Ploiești and Civitas Făgăraș (Seria VI). The winners of the 21 Play-Off matches of 2013–14 Liga IV series were promoted to Liga III.

League tables

Seria I

Seria II

Seria III

Seria IV

Seria V

References

2014
3
Romania